Andrew Goldstein (born March 17, 1986) is an American musician, singer, songwriter, and record producer. He was born in Reston, Virginia, and attended James Madison University, graduating in 2008.

Goldstein began his career by singing in the band The Friday Night Boys on Fueled by Ramen. He has written and produced for such acts as Katy Perry, Britney Spears, Linkin Park, Demi Lovato, 5 Seconds of Summer, blackbear, Ne-Yo, Maroon 5, Celine Dion, All Time Low, Illenium, Machine Gun Kelly and Kane Brown. He also releases music as a solo artist and is sometimes credited under the name FRND.

Discography

References 

Record producers from Virginia
Living people
1986 births
Singer-songwriters from Virginia
People from Reston, Virginia
American male singer-songwriters
21st-century American singers
James Madison University alumni
21st-century American male singers